Kapawe'no 229 is an Indian reserve of the Kapawe'no First Nation in Alberta, located within Big Lakes County. It is 27 kilometres northeast of High Prairie.

References

Indian reserves in Alberta